The Communist Youth of Greece ( Kommounistiki Neolea Elladas, KNE) is the youth wing of the Communist Party of Greece (KKE).

It publishes the monthly newspaper Odigitis (Greek: Οδηγητής, "guider") and hosts Odigitis festivals in most of the major towns and cities of Greece.

KNE is a member of the World Federation of Democratic Youth.

History 
KNE was founded on 15 September 1968, with a decision of Politburo of the Central Committee of the KKE, during the Greek military junta of 1967-1974, as an organization of youth with revolutionary and communist features.

It was the historical continuation of OKNE (Organization of Communist Youth of Greece), of all the organizations of youth which had already taken part in people's struggle in Greece, such as EPON (United Panhellenic Organization of Youth), DNE (Democratic Youth of Greece), D.N.Lampraki (Democratic Youth "Lamprakis").

In 1989-1991, a deep crisis shocked KNE and KKE. In autumn 1989, disagreeing with the participation of KKE in the Tzannetakis and Zolotas national unity governments, a large group, including the major part of KNE under its secretary-general ,  from the KKE and formed the New Left Current (NAR). The KKE, then part of the Synaspismos coalition, attempted to dissolve KNE into the Synaspismos Youth League. Later in 1991, KKE left the coalition, purged all non-hardliners (incl. 45% of the central committee and KKE secretary-general ), and restored KNE with the efforts of some hundreds of members. In March 1993, the 6th Congress of the Organization took place.

In the late 2000s, KNE decided to constitute MAS (Front of Students' Struggle) which was finally founded by students' organizations in Athens, 6 November 2009.

The congresses of KNE
1st Congress (19–22 February 1976)
2nd Congress (4–7 April 1979)
3rd Congress (14–18 December 1983)
4th Congress (1–5 June 1988)
5th Congress (25–27 January 1990)
6th Congress (19–21 March 1993) "The hope is in our struggle, with KKE we open the road to the future"
7th Congress (1–4 May 1997) "Youth's counter-attack to imperialism, with KKE for Socialism"
8th Congress (21–23 December 2001) "Youth dynamic in struggle with working class and the people,for the Front, for the Socialism"
9th Congress (12–14 May 2006) - Resolution
10th Congress (7–9 May 2010) - "Communism is the youth of the world, KNE our organization"
11th Congress (18–21 December 2014) - "Pioneer youth of KKE - combatively en route for the socialist tomorrow - without crises, wars, exploitation"
12th Congress (15-17 February 2019) - "Even more, more capable, we pave the way for what is truly contemporary and young, for a world “worthy of our dreams, and worthy of our people”, Socialism!"

List of Secretaries
Dimitris Tsiaras (1968-1972)
Dimitris Gontikas (1972-1979)
Spyros Chalvatzis (1979-1984)
Giorgos Grapsas (1984-1989)
Takis Theodorikakos (1989-1991)
Nikos Sofianos (1991-2000)
Themis Gionis (2000-2007)
Giannis Protoulis (2007-2011)
Thodoris Chionis (2011-2015)
Nikos Abatielos (2015-today)

Odigitis festival 
Odigitis festival is a series of annual festivals organized in most of the major towns and cities of Greece by the KNE.

See also
 Young Communist League of Greece

External links 

 Communist Youth of Greece (KNE) – Official site
 Odigitis newspaper

Youth wings of communist parties
Youth wings of political parties in Greece
Communist Party of Greece
1968 establishments in Greece